In geometry, the tetraapeirogonal tiling is a uniform tiling of the hyperbolic plane with a Schläfli symbol of r{∞,4}.

Uniform constructions
There are 3 lower symmetry uniform construction, one with two colors of apeirogons, one with two colors of squares, and one with two colors of each:

Symmetry
The dual to this tiling represents the fundamental domains of *∞2∞2 symmetry group. The symmetry can be doubled by adding mirrors on either diagonal of the rhombic domains, creating *∞∞2 and *∞44 symmetry.

Related polyhedra and tiling

See also

 List of uniform planar tilings
 Tilings of regular polygons
 Uniform tilings in hyperbolic plane

References

 John H. Conway, Heidi Burgiel, Chaim Goodman-Strass, The Symmetries of Things 2008,  (Chapter 19, "The Hyperbolic Archimedean Tessellations")

External links
 
 

Apeirogonal tilings
Hyperbolic tilings
Isogonal tilings
Isotoxal tilings
Uniform tilings